SS Samingoy was a Liberty ship built in the United States during World War II. She was transferred to the British Ministry of War Transportation (MoWT) upon completion.

Construction
Samingoy was laid down on 24 March 1944, under a Maritime Commission (MARCOM) contract, MC hull 2357, by J.A. Jones Construction, Brunswick, Georgia; sponsored by Mrs. Parks M. King, and launched on 30 April 1944.

History
She was allocated to New Zealand Shipping, on 13 May 1944. On 20 June 1947, she was sold to the Federal Steam Navigation Company, Ltd., for commercial use, and renamed Stafford. After going through a couple of owners she was renamed Hernan Cortes and reflagged Panamanian, in 1961. She ran aground on Alacran Reef, Yucutan, and was declared a constructive total loss (CTL) on 15 October 1966. She was scrapped the following year.

References

Bibliography

 
 
 
 
 

 

Liberty ships
Ships built in Brunswick, Georgia
1944 ships
Liberty ships transferred to the British Ministry of War Transport
Maritime incidents in 1966